Bury was a borough constituency centred on the town of Bury in Lancashire.  It returned one Member of Parliament (MP) to the House of Commons of the Parliament of the United Kingdom.

The constituency was created for the 1832 general election, and abolished for the 1950 general election, when it was largely replaced by the new constituency of Bury & Radcliffe.

Boundaries
1885-1918: The existing parliamentary borough, and so much of the municipal borough of Bury as was not already included in the parliamentary borough.

1918-1950: The county borough of Bury and the urban district of Tottington.

Members of Parliament

Elections

Elections in the 1830s

Elections in the 1840s

Elections in the 1850s

Elections in the 1860s

Elections in the 1870s

Elections in the 1880s

Elections in the 1890s

Elections in the 1900s

Elections in the 1910s

General Election 1914–15:

Another General Election was required to take place before the end of 1915. The political parties had been making preparations for an election to take place and by the July 1914, the following candidates had been selected; 
Liberal: George Toulmin
Unionist:

Elections in the 1920s

Elections in the 1930s

Elections in the 1940s
General Election 1939–40
Another General Election was required to take place before the end of 1940. The political parties had been making preparations for an election to take place from 1939 and by the end of this year, the following candidates had been selected; 
Labour: William Harvey Moore

References 

Parliamentary constituencies in North West England (historic)
Constituencies of the Parliament of the United Kingdom established in 1832
Constituencies of the Parliament of the United Kingdom disestablished in 1950
Politics of the Metropolitan Borough of Bury